P. Jayachandran  (born 12 April 1971), better known by his pen name Unni R., is an Indian short-story writer and screenwriter, who is known for his work in Malayalam literature and Malayalam cinema. Born in Kudamaloor in Kottayam district, he is currently based in Thiruvananthapuram, Kerala, India. He studied in Kudamaloor LP school, CMS college High school, CMS College Kottayam and Baselius College, Kottayam. Unni R. won the Kerala State Film Award for Best Screenplay for the film Charlie (2015).

Career 
For the story of same name, he has received the Kerala Sahithya Academy Geetha Hiranyan Endowment, Anganam-E.P. Sushama Endowment and Thomas Mundasseri Award. Ozhivudivasathe Kali has been later made into the film of the same name by Director Sanal Shashidaran. It won the 46th Kerala State Award for Best Film in 2015. He was a recipient of several awards including K.A. Kodunalloor Award and T.P Kishore Memorial Award (both for Praanilokam); V.P. Shivakumar Memorial Award and SBT Award (both for Mudraraakshasam); as well as Abu Dhabi Shakti Award and Ayanam C.V. Sriraman Award (both for Kottayam 17)

His works have been translated into English and other Indian languages such as Tamil. His Leela and Bhootam were translated for the Tamil monthly magazine Kaalachuvadu by Tamil poet Sukumaran. Kalinaadakam which was translated to Tamil has been widely read and noted Tamil writer Perumal Murukan opined in his 19th D.C. Kizhakemuri Memorial lecture that Unni R.’s stories have extensive readership in Tamil Nadu along with the veterans such as Thakazhi Sivasankara Pillai, Vaikom Muhammad Basheer, M.T. Vasudevan Nair and Madhavikutty. Several of his articles, including one on Nakulan and on Madhavikutty, were also translated to Tamil and English. Indian Literature, a bi-monthly journal of Sahitya Academy featured his translated stories – Catwalk (Vol.231/2006) and Pedestrian named Badushah (Vol 260/2010). Malayalam Literary Survey (Jan-Mar 2008) published the translation of his short story, The Kali Play.

Besides screen writing, he has also acted as supporting roles in Aparahnam, Chappakurishu, Munnariyippu etc. He started his career as a sub-editor in the Karpooram Weekly, Kottayam, Kerala (1994-1995). He also worked as a Producer in Asianet Satellite Communications for a long period of time (1995-2013).

Unni R.'s short story "Vaanku" won the 2020 Kerala Sahitya Akademi Award for Story and was made into the 2021 film of the same name.

Bibliography

Short story Collections 
 Ozhivu Divasathe Kali
 Kali Nadakam
 Kottayam 17
 Kadhakal
 Oru Bhayankara Kamukan
 One hell of a lover, selection of short stories translated from the Malayalam by J. Devika, Chennai: Eka, 2019.

Other works 
 Chumbikkunna Manushyar Chumbikkatha Manushyar (Essays)
 Basheer (Editor, Essays)
Prathi Poovan Kozhi (Novel )

Filmography

Awards and honours 
 Kerala State Film Award 2015 (Best Screenplay) - Charlie
 Geetha Hiranyan Endovement - Ozhivu Divasathe Kali (2006)
 Thomas Mundasseri Award - Ozhivu Divasathe Kali
 Ankanam E.P. Sushama Endovement- Ozhivu Divasathe Kali
 Abu Dhabi Sakthi Award - Kottayam 17
 Ayanam C.V. Sreeraman Award - Kottayam 17
 K.A. Kodungalloor Story Award
 T.P. Kishore Award
 V.P. Sivakumar Memorial Keli Award
 Mohan Raghavan Award for Best Script Charlie
 IIFA Award for Best story Charlie
 Freedia Entertainments North  America Film Award for best Script Charlie

References

Notes

External links 

 

1971 births
Living people
Screenwriters from Kerala
Malayalam short story writers
Malayalam screenwriters
Indian male short story writers
Indian male screenwriters
21st-century Indian short story writers
21st-century Indian male writers
21st-century Indian screenwriters